Archibald Algernon Henry St. Maur, formerly Seymour, 13th Duke of Somerset, etc. (30 December 1810 – 28 Berkeley Square, London, Oct 1891) was the son of Edward St. Maur, 11th Duke of Somerset and Lady Charlotte Douglas-Hamilton. He was also a baronet. His motto, "Faith for Duty", has been adopted by HMS Somerset (IV) by permission.

He was baptized on 17 June 1811 at St. George's, Hanover Square, London, and succeeded his brother Edward Seymour, 12th Duke of Somerset, in 1885. In his younger years, he had served as a captain in the Royal Horse Guards. He spent much of his life at Burton Hall, in The Wolds, managing the estate. He served as High Sheriff of Leicestershire for 1844.

Archibald died at the age of 80, unmarried and childless, was interred at Maiden Bradley, Warminster, Wiltshire, and his titles passed to his brother, Algernon St. Maur.

Ancestry

References

The 13th Duke of Somerset is interred in the church graveyard at Berry Pomeroy, Devon.  The grave is made of red granite and situated next to the main gate. born 10 December 1810 - died 10 January 1891

External links

1810 births
1891 deaths
513
Archibald Seymour, 13th Duke of Somerset
High Sheriffs of Leicestershire
Younger sons of dukes